Semyonovka is a rural locality (a settlement) in Shipunikhinsky Selsoviet, Tretyakovsky District, Altai Krai, Russia. The population was 131 as of 2013. There are 7 streets.

Geography 
Semyonovka is located 45 km east of Staroaleyskoye (the district's administrative centre) by road. Ivanovka is the nearest rural locality.

References 

Rural localities in Tretyakovsky District